Marlon Jordan (born August 21, 1970) is an American jazz trumpeter, composer, and bandleader.

Early life

Born Marlon Jordan, one of six performers of a family of New Orleans musicians. He is the son of saxophonist Edward "Kidd" Jordan and classical pianist Edvidge Jordan, and brother flutist Kent, sisters violinist Rachel, and jazz singer Stephanie. While they have pursued separate careers, the family frequently collaborates. Marlon started playing trumpet in the fourth grade, and graduated from the New Orleans Center for Creative Arts. He knew Wynton Marsalis (a major influence) and Terence Blanchard when he was a child. Marlon recorded as a sideman with his brother Kent (1987) and Dennis González (1988).

Career
At age 18, recorded his debut album as a leader, For You Only (1988), Branford Marsalis makes four appearances on tenor; Marlon's brother, flautist Kent Jordan, is heard on the opening "Jepetto's Despair," and there are two duets with bassist/pianist Elton Heron. Four standards (including "Cherokee" and "Stardust") are performed. Marlon took his quintet on the road, joined by Wynton Marsalis, Miles Davis and George Benson as a headlining act in a series of JVC Jazz Festival dates. They also played in some of the country's top jazz clubs, including the Blue Note and the Ritz, as well as in concerts ranging from New York's Avery Fisher Hall to Binghamton University.

Marlon's fifth album, You Don’t Know What Love Is (2005), is definitely a family affair, features his sister Stephanie Jordan on breathtaking, silvery vocals on five of the album's eight tracks. Marlon is joined here by his father patriarch Edward Jordan; sister Stephanie, winner of the “Billie Holiday Competition” for Jazz vocalist; sister Rachel, violinist with the Louisiana Philharmonic Orchestra; and brother Kent Jordan flautist. There is also uncle Alvin Batiste, clarinet; cousin Jonathan Bloom, percussion; uncle Maynard Chatters, trombone; and Chatters’ son, Mark, trumpet. They all come together for a fantastic voyage through fresh interpretations of eight jazz standards, all injected with a bit of New Orleans vibe. Track listing: "My Favorite Things"; "All Blues"; "You Don’t Know What Love Is"; "Joey"; "Flamingo"; "Portrait"; "You Leave Me Breathless"; "Now Baby", and "Or Never".

Marlon and sister Stephanie during the fall of 2005 as Jazz Ambassadors on a European Tour as part of the Higher Ground Relief effort sponsored by the U.S. Department of State, and Jazz at Lincoln Center to thank the people of Europe for their support of New Orleans and the Gulf Region following Hurricane Katrina. The countries included Bucharest, Germany, Lithuania and Ukraine.

Discography

Footnotes

External links
 Marlon Jordan official website

1970 births
Living people
21st-century American male musicians
21st-century trumpeters
American jazz bandleaders
American jazz composers
American jazz trumpeters
American male jazz composers
American male trumpeters
Arabesque Records artists
Hard bop trumpeters